Lysiphragma argentaria is a species of moth in the family Tineidae. It is endemic to New Zealand. It is classified as "At Risk, Naturally Uncommon" by the Department of Conservation.

Taxonomy
This species was first described by John Salmon in 1948 using a specimen collected by Graham Turbott on 22 April 1946 on Great Island at the Three Kings Islands. The family level classification of this endemic moth is regarded as unsatisfactory, and it is not correctly placed in the genus Lysiphragma. As such the species is currently also known as Lysiphragma (s.l.) argentaria. The holotype specimen is held at the Auckland War Memorial Museum.

Description
Salmon described this species as follows:

Distribution
This species is endemic to New Zealand. It is only found on the Three Kings Islands.

Biology and behaviour 
Much of the biology of this species is unknown. This species is attracted to light. Adults of this species are on the wing in April.

Host species and habitat 
The holotype specimen was collected on a "tea tree".

Conservation Status 
This species has been classified as having the "At Risk, Naturally Uncommon" conservation status under the New Zealand Threat Classification System.

References

Moths described in 1948
Tineidae
Moths of New Zealand
Endemic fauna of New Zealand
Endangered biota of New Zealand
Taxa named by Edward Meyrick
Three Kings Islands
Endemic moths of New Zealand